United Nations Security Council resolution 1063, adopted unanimously on 28 June 1996, after recalling all Security Council and General Assembly resolutions on Haiti and the termination of the United Nations Mission in Haiti (UNMIH) on 30 June 1996 in accordance with Resolution 1048 (1996), the Council decided to establish the United Nations Support Mission in Haiti (UNSMIH) to train a national police force and maintain a stable environment.

The Security Council affirmed the importance of a fully operational professional Haitian police force and the revitalisation of the legal system. In this regard, UNSMIH was established to maintain a stable environment and assist in the training of a new police force, initially until 30 November 1996. The mission would initially consist of 300 policemen and 600 troops. Haiti also had to quickly receive additional financial support from international institutions for the reconstruction of the country.

Finally, the Secretary-General Boutros Boutros-Ghali requested by 30 September 1996 to report on the implementation of the current resolution and to seek further opportunities to reduce the operational costs of UNSMIH.

See also
 History of Haiti
 List of United Nations Security Council Resolutions 1001 to 1100 (1995–1997)
 Operation Uphold Democracy

References

External links
 
Text of the Resolution at undocs.org

 1063
1996 in Haiti
 1063
June 1996 events